Christopher Noel Cullen is a British psychologist who specialised in the field of learning disability.

Life
Chris Cullen completed his PhD at Bangor University which at that time was the centre of radical behaviourism and its application to clinical issues. He recalls meeting with B.F. Skinner in London at that time. After working for a short period as a research assistant he trained in clinical psychology and developed an expertise in working with people with learning disabilities. He was appointed to the Chair of Learning Disabilities at St. Andrew's University and then, in 1995, moved to Keele University as both Professor of Clinical Psychology and Clinical Director for Psychological Therapies for North Staffordshire.  He retired as Emeritus Professor of Clinical Psychology. 

He was active in the British Psychological Society, of which he was the Chief National Assessor. He was elected President of the Society in 1997. His presidential address was on the topic of behaviour analysis in work and therapy. He was also elected President of the British Association for Behavioural and Cognitive Psychotherapies.

Work
His clinical work focused on Acceptance and Commitment Therapy, one of the ‘third wave’ cognitive therapies arising out of radical behaviourism.

Awards
 Lifetime Achievement Award, British Psychological Society
 Honorary Fellow, British Association for Behavioural and Cognitive Psychotherapies

Position
 1997-1998: President, British Psychological Society
 2005-2006: President, British Association for Behavioural and Cognitive Psychotherapies

Publications
 Cullen, C. (1991). Ethics and clinical practise : a behavioural analysis. In P. J. Barker and S. Baldwin (Eds.). Ethical Issues in Mental Health. London: Chapman Hall.
 Cullen, C. (1992). Staff training and management for intellectual disability services. International Review of Research in Mental Retardation, 18, 225-245.
 Cullen, C. (1996). Challenging behaviour and intellectual disability : Assessment, analysis and treatment. British Journal of Clinical Psychology, 35, 153-156.
 Cullen, C. (1998). The trouble with rules : behaviour analysis in work and therapy. The Psychologist, 11, 471-475.
 Cullen, C. (1999). Contextualism in intellectual disability research: the case of choice behaviour. Journal of Intellectual Disability Research, 43, pp 00-00.
 Cullen, C., Brown, J.F., Combes, H., & Hendy, S. (1999). Working with people who have intellectual impairments. In J. Marzillier & J. Hall (Eds.). What is Clinical Psychology (3rd edition).
 Cullen, C. & Mappin, R. (1998). An examination of the effects of gentle teaching on people with complex learning disabilities and challenging behaviour. British Journal of Clinical Psychology, 37, 199-211.

References

British psychologists
Presidents of the British Psychological Society
Clinical psychologists
Academics of the University of St Andrews
Academics of Keele University
Year of birth missing (living people)
Living people
Alumni of Bangor University